Asterix: The Secret of the Magic Potion is a 2018 French computer-animated adventure family comedy film co-directed by Alexandre Astier and Louis Clichy. A sequel to 2014's Asterix: The Mansions of the Gods, the screenplay by Astier is based on the Asterix comic book characters created by René Goscinny and Albert Uderzo. This is the first Asterix production not to feature Roger Carel as the voice of Asterix, due to his retirement. Asterix is instead voiced by Christian Clavier, who previously played the character in Asterix and Obelix vs. Caesar and Asterix & Obelix: Mission Cleopatra.

The film was released in France on 5 December 2018 by SND. Icon Film Distribution released the film's English dub in Australia starting 30 May 2019.

Plot
In the forest outside the village of indomitable Gauls, the druid Getafix falls from a tree, breaking his foot. Worried about his mortality, he resolves to find a successor to inherit the secret recipe of his magic potion which imbues the user with superhuman strength. He is escorted to a meeting of his fellow druids by Asterix and Obelix, while a creative young village girl named Pectine has stowed away in his cauldron. The meeting is disrupted by Getafix's nemesis, Sulfurix (Demonix in the English dub), who wreaks havoc before being chased away. Getafix then travels throughout Gaul to meet with aspiring young druids in his quest for a successor. He is accompanied by Chief Vitalstatistix and the village's other men, with the exception of Cacofonix, who remains behind with the village women and a reserve supply of magic potion to repel attacks by Roman legionaries.

Sulfurix offers Julius Caesar the chance to secure the recipe and is assisted by Senator Tomcrus, who plots to attack the village until it runs out of potion. Sulfurix recruits the unwitting Teleferix (Cholerix), a promising young druid, and teaches him magic in order to impress Getafix. Asterix uncovers their plot but is captured before he can warn the others. Sulfurix burns down the sacred forest of the druids, while Getafix chooses Teleferix as his successor. News soon reaches the Gauls that Cacofonix and the women have run out of magic potion.

Getafix has Obelix, Pectine and Teleferix help him source most of the ingredients for the potion. However, Sulfurix steals them and freezes Obelix with a spell. Getafix returns home for his reserve ingredients, but finds them squandered by his fellow druids vying to make their own concoctions. Sulfurix orders Teleferix to make the potion, but a key ingredient is missing. Sulfurix inadvertently augments the incomplete mixture with his fire magic, consumes the resultant potion and attacks both the Gauls and the Romans.

Pectine brings the leftover ingredients to Getafix, who instructs her to make the potion and reveals the missing ingredient is a drop of Magic Potion from a previous batch, secretly stored with the handle of his golden sickle. Getafix then battles Sulfurix and is saved by Asterix and Obelix. Sulfurix is punched out of the village, but lands in a puddle of potion that transforms him into a giant. The Romans and the Gauls join forces to combat him and drink the potion made by Pectine. Getafix uses his own magic to form the Roman legionaries into a giant centaur 'robot', which is guided by Obelix and defeats Sulfurix.

With the danger over, the Romans retreat and Getafix advises Teleferix to return home to restart his training. As the Gauls celebrate with a feast, Getafix tells Pectine that she will eventually forget the secret of the magic potion, but the young girl states that she just can't get the recipe out of her head. It is hinted that Getafix may intend to make Pectine his successor.

Voice cast

French
 Christian Clavier as Asterix
  as Obelix
 Bernard Alane as Panoramix (Getafix)
 Daniel Mesguich as Sulfurix (Demonix)
  as Pectine
 Alex Lutz as Teleferix (Cholerix)
 Alexandre Astier as Oursenplus (Somniferus)
 Elie Semoun as Cubitus (Marcus Ubiquitus)
 Gerard Hernandez as Atmospherix
  as Cétautomatix (Fulliautomatix)
 François Morel as Ordralfabétix (Unhygienix)
 Florence Foresti as Bonemine (Impedimenta)
 Olivier Saladin as Senator Tomcrus
  as Assurancetourix (Cacofonix)

English
  Ken Kramer as Asterix
  C. Ernst Harth as Obelix
  John Innes as Getafix
  Fleur Delahunty as Pectin
  Michael Shepherd as Demonix (Sulfurix)
  Don Brown as Vitalstatistix
  Andrew Cownden as Cacofonix and Senator Tomcrus
  Saffron Henderson as Impedimenta and Bacteria
  Michael Adamthwaite as Cholerix (Teleferix) and Humerus
  Scott McNeil as Fulliautomatix
  Jason Simpson as Unhygienix, Somniferus, Breadstix, and Virgindaikirix
  Ron Halder as Geriatrix
  Mark Oliver as Julius Caesar
  Sam Vincent as Tofungus
  Brian Drummond as Cakemix
  Alec Willows as Atmospherix
  Howard Siegel as Phantasmagorix
Richard Newman as Fotovoltahix
  Brian Dobson as Cassius Ceramix

Reception

Box office
The film was released on 5 December 2018 across France, taking more than $2 million in revenue on the opening Wednesday and close to $7 million through Sunday night.

References

External links
 
 Official Page

2018 films
2018 computer-animated films
2010s French-language films
2010s French animated films
2010s adventure comedy films
Animated adventure films
Animated comedy films
Animated films based on comics
Asterix films
Films set in the Viking Age
French adventure comedy films
French animated speculative fiction films
French children's films
French computer-animated films
Films directed by Alexandre Astier
2018 comedy films